Carlos Guerra (born ) is a Mexican male volleyball player. He was part of the Mexico men's national volleyball team at the  2010 FIVB Volleyball Men's World Championship in Italy, at the 2014 FIVB Volleyball Men's World Championship in Poland and at the Volleyball at the 2016 Summer Olympics in Rio. He currently plays for Volero Aarberg.

Clubs
 A.E.K Athens (2003)
 SEAT Volley Näfels (2004)
 Leones de Ponce (2006)
 Numancia Soria (2006)
 Volley Münsingen (2014)
 LUC Volleyball Lausanne (2009)
 Chênois Genève Volleyball (2011)
 Volley Schönenwerd (2016)
 Volero Aarberg (2020)

See also
List of Pennsylvania State University Olympians

References

External links
 profile at FIVB.org
 profile at volleybox.net

1981 births
Living people
Mexican men's volleyball players
Sportspeople from Tampico, Tamaulipas
Olympic volleyball players of Mexico
Volleyball players at the 2016 Summer Olympics
Penn State Nittany Lions men's volleyball players